Sir Herbert Henniker Heaton,  (9 February 1880 – 24 January 1961) was a British colonial administrator. He was Governor of the Falkland Islands from 1935 to 1941.

The third son of Sir John Henniker Heaton, Bt., Herbert Henniker-Heaton was educated at Eton College and New College, Oxford. He entered the Colonial Service in 1902, being posted to Fiji as a cadet for his first posting. In 1913, he was appointed Assistant Colonial Secretary, Mauritius, and in 1917 Colonial Secretary, Gambia.

Note

References 

Younger sons of baronets
1880 births
1961 deaths
Knights Commander of the Order of St Michael and St George
Governors of the Falkland Islands
Alumni of New College, Oxford
Colonial Service officers
British people in British Fiji
British people in British Mauritius
British people in British Gambia